Saarru (Inuktitut syllabics ᓵᕐᕈ) formerly Alareak Island is an uninhabited island in the Qikiqtaaluk Region of Nunavut, Canada. It is a Baffin Island offshore island in Hudson Strait on the southwest side of Andrew Gordon Bay.

References

Islands of Baffin Island
Islands of Hudson Strait
Uninhabited islands of Qikiqtaaluk Region